The Bridges Baronetcy, of Goodnestone in the County of Kent, was created in the Baronetage of Great Britain on 19 April 1718 for Brook Bridges. His son the second Baronet, died in 1733 whilst in office as High Sheriff of Kent. His grandson, the third Baronet, represented Kent in the House of Commons. In 1842, the fifth Baronet (the grandson of the third Baronet), unsuccessfully claimed the ancient barony of FitzWalter (which had been in abeyance since 1756) as a descendant of Mary, sister of the seventeenth Baron FitzWalter. He later sat as a Member of Parliament for Kent East. In 1868 he was created Baron FitzWalter, of Woodham Walter in the County of Essex, in the Peerage of the United Kingdom. However, the peerage became extinct on his death, while he was succeeded in the baronetcy by his younger brother, the sixth Baronet. On his death the title passed to his first cousin, the seventh Baronet. He was the son of Reverend Brook Henry Bridges, third son of the third Baronet. When he died this line of the family also failed and the title was passed on to his first cousin, the eighth Baronet. He was the son of Reverend Brook Edward Bridges, fourth son of the third Baronet. He never married and on his death in 1899 the baronetcy became extinct.

The seat of the Bridges family was Goodnestone Park in Kent. The house was built in 1704 by the first Bridges Baronet. After the death of the last Baronet in 1899 the house came into the Plumptre family through the marriage of  Eleanor Bridges, daughter of the fourth Bridges Baronet, to Reverend Henry Western Plumptre. In 1924 the abeyance of the barony of FitzWalter was terminated in favour of the latter's grandson, John Bridges Plumptre.

Bridges baronets, of Goodneston (1718)
Sir Brook Bridges, 1st Baronet (1679–1728)
Sir Brook Bridges, 2nd Baronet (1709–1733)
Sir Brook William Bridges, 3rd Baronet (1733–1791)
Sir Brook William Bridges, 4th Baronet (1767–1829)
Sir Brook William Bridges, 5th Baronet (1801–1875) (created Baron FitzWalter in 1868)

Barons FitzWalter (1868)
Brook William Bridges, 1st Baron FitzWalter (1801–1875)

Bridges baronets, of Goodneston (1718; Reverted)
Sir Brook George Bridges, 6th Baronet (1802–1890)
Sir Thomas Pym Bridges, 7th Baronet (1805–1895)
Sir George Talbot Bridges, 8th Baronet (1818–1899)

See also
Baron FitzWalter

External links
Goodnestone Park

References
Kidd, Charles, Williamson, David (editors). Debrett's Peerage and Baronetage (1990 edition). New York: St Martin's Press, 1990.

Extinct baronetcies in the Baronetage of Great Britain
Extinct baronies in the Peerage of the United Kingdom